DeCamp Bus Lines is an apportioned bus company serving Essex County, New Jersey and Passaic County, New Jersey, with line-run to and from Manhattan and charter service.

History
The family-run business was started as a stage-coach company, in 1870.

Route Stops
There are no fixed stops other than terminals, buses can be hailed to board; riders can request a stop to exit. 

Local passengers within New Jersey are not carried on any line except for the 32.

Passenger Traffic
According to the company it normally carries up to 7,000 passengers per day.

2020 Coronavirus Pandemic
All service was suspended in March 25, 2020 due to the COVID-19 pandemic in New Jersey. 

It resumed in June, but was again curtailed on August 7, 2020 due to low unsustainable ridership.

In May 2021, DeCamp began to resume operations once again starting with charter services. On June 14, 2021, commuter services also resumed on a limited weekday schedule.

Routes

Map

References

External links
 DeCamp Bus Lines

Surface transportation in Greater New York
Transport companies established in 1870
Companies based in Essex County, New Jersey
Montclair, New Jersey
Transportation in Essex County, New Jersey
Transportation in Hudson County, New Jersey
Transportation in Passaic County, New Jersey
Bus transportation in New Jersey
1870 establishments in New Jersey